Vasilije Petrović (1709 – 10 March 1766) was the metropolitan bishop of Cetinje (Prince-Bishop of Montenegro), ruling with Sava Petrović, his cousin. He was author of the History of Montenegro, published in 1754.

Political background
The modern political history of Montenegro began with Metropolitan Danilo, who founded a state ruled by a dynasty from the Petrović-Njegoš family. Danilo was eventually succeeded by his two nephews, first by Sava Petrović, and then by Vasilije.

Bishop Sava was a secluded person, and dedicated himself more to religion than to politics. He had some influence among the tribesmen of Montenegro. He advocated for Montenegrin dependence on Russia as a means of defeating the Ottoman Empire and achieving statehood for Montenegro. He also maintained good relations with the Republic of Venice.

Term
During his term, Vasilije ruled together with Sava, his brother, as his coadjutor. Between 1750 and 1766 he unsuccessfully tried to convince Austria's Maria Theresa that "since the time of Alexander the Great" Montenegro had been a "separate republic.. [over which] rules her metropolitan".

From 1752 to 1754, he stayed in Russia and thereafter made additional trips to gain Russian assistance. With the help of Russian arms, he went to war with the Turks and then had to seek refuge back to Russia. In 1766 while in St. Petersburg, he died of pneumonia.

Aftermath
After Vasilije, Sava took power and continued with the same foreign policy as before, allying himself with Venice. That did not last long however, as Šćepan Mali who, claiming to be the Russian Tsar Peter III himself, managed to convince the people that he should rule Montenegro.

He immediately severed ties with Venice altogether, implemented the strict rule of law, began building roads until his life was cut short in 1773 by an assassin sent by the Vizier of Skadar.

Sava returned to serve as metropolitan once again, and after him his nephew, Arsenije Plamenac of Crmnica, became metropolitan. But Arsenije, too, was soon to die, in 1784. Once again a member of the Petrović-Njegoš, now Petar I Petrović-Njegoš, was inaugurated.

Literary works
The writing and teaching of Montenegrin history was a chief interest for most of Vasilije's life, as well as his occupation as a spiritual leader. Istorija o Černoj Gori (History of Montenegro), published in St. Petersburg in 1754, is his most renowned work. Through accounts from ordinary citizens, the book represented the first attempt to write the history of Montenegro. It was an effort on the part of Vasilije to gain Russian political support for Montenegro against the Ottomans by highlighting and mythologizing Montenegrin struggles. It put forth the idea of Montenegrin independence for the first time, though it did not have a large immediate impact. Parts of the Cetinje chronicle are also attributed to him.

Bibliography
 History of Montenegro
 Ode to Nemanja

Title
Metropolitan of Montenegro, Skenderija and Primorje, and Exarch of the Serb throne (smjerni mitropolit crnogorski, skenderijski i primorski i trona srpskoga egzarh)

References

External links
Vladika Vasilije about Montenegro - in Montenegrin
Prof. Dr. Božidar Šekularac: The Role of Vladika Vasilije in Montenegrin History- in Montenegrin
The Excerpt from Istorija o Černoj Gori - in Montenegrin

1709 births
1766 deaths
18th-century Eastern Orthodox bishops
Petrović-Njegoš dynasty
Prince-bishops of Montenegro
Bishops of Montenegro and the Littoral
Writers from Cetinje
Rulers of Montenegro
Burials at the Annunciation Church of the Alexander Nevsky Lavra
Clergy from Cetinje